The  is a single championship title in the Japanese professional wrestling promotion Real Japan Pro Wrestling (RJPW). The title was established in 2018 as part of a collaboration between RJPW and the revived Mexican Universal Wrestling Association. As it is a professional wrestling championship, the championship is not won not by actual competition, but by a scripted ending to a match determined by the bookers and match makers. On occasion the promotion declares a championship vacant, which means there is no champion at that point in time. This can either be due to a storyline, or real life issues such as a champion suffering an injury being unable to defend the championship, or leaving the company.

, there have been a total of five reigns. The current champion is Shogun Okamoto who is in his second reign.

History
On February 28, 2018, a press conference was held in Tokyo, Japan announcing a Universal Wrestling Association (UWA) revival. As part of the revival, the UWA Asia Pacific Heavyweight Championship was created and Rey Ángel was appointed as the first champion with a title defense scheduled on September 20 against Kouki Iwasaki from Ganbare☆Pro-Wrestling.

Reigns

Combined reigns

Footnotes

References

External links
UWA Asia Pacific Heavyweight Championship

Continental professional wrestling championships
Heavyweight wrestling championships
Universal Wrestling Association championships